The  is a baseball player transfer system that operates between Nippon Professional Baseball (NPB) and Major League Baseball (MLB). Despite the drafting of the United States – Japanese Player Contract Agreement, unveiled in 1967 to regulate NPB players moving to MLB, problems began to arise in the late 1990s. Some NPB teams lost star players without compensation, an issue highlighted when NPB stars Hideo Nomo and Alfonso Soriano left to play in MLB after using loopholes to void their existing contracts. A further problem was that NPB players had very little negotiating power if their teams decided to deal them to MLB, as when pitcher Hideki Irabu was traded to an MLB team for which he had no desire to play. In 1998, the Agreement was rewritten to address both problems; the result was dubbed the "posting system".

Under this system, when an NPB player is "posted", his NPB team notifies the MLB Commissioner, with the posting fee based on the type of contract a player signs and its value. The fee is a flat 25% of the value of a minor-league contract; for MLB contracts, the fee is based on the value of the contract that the posted player eventually signs. The player is then given 30 days to negotiate with any MLB team willing to pay the NPB team's posting fee. If the player agrees on contract terms with a team before the 30-day period has expired, the NPB team receives the posting fee from the signing MLB team as a transfer fee, and the player is free to play in MLB. If no MLB team comes to a contract agreement with the posted player, then no fee is paid, and the player's rights revert to his NPB team. The current process replaced one in which MLB held a silent auction during which MLB teams submitted sealed, uncapped bids in an attempt to win the exclusive negotiating rights with the posted player for a period of 30 days. Once the highest bidding MLB team was determined, the player could then only negotiate with that team.

Up to the end of the 2017–18 posting period, 23 NPB players had been posted using the system. Of these, 12 signed Major League contracts, four signed minor-league contracts, five were unsuccessful in attracting any MLB interest, and two could not come to a contract agreement during the 30-day negotiation period. The five highest-profile players that have been acquired by MLB teams through the posting system are Ichiro Suzuki, Daisuke Matsuzaka, Yu Darvish, Masahiro Tanaka, and Shohei Ohtani. The first three attracted high bids of $13.125 million, $51.1 million, and $51.7 million respectively. Tanaka was the first player posted under a revised procedure that was in place from 2013 to 2017; he was posted for the maximum $20 million allowed under the new rules. Ohtani was the first player posted under the current procedure; his posting fee of $20 million was grandfathered in under the previous agreement. However, since its implementation the posting system has been criticized by the media and baseball insiders from both countries.

History
The first instance of a Japanese-born player playing in Major League Baseball was in 1964, when the Nankai Hawks, an NPB team, sent three exchange prospects to the United States to gain experience in MLB's minor league system. One of the players, pitcher Masanori Murakami, was named the California League Rookie of the Year while playing for the Fresno Giants (the San Francisco Giants' Class-A team).
Giants executives were impressed with his talent and on September 1, 1964 Murakami was promoted, thus becoming the first Japanese player to play in MLB. After Murakami put up good pitching statistics as a reliever, Giants executives sought to exercise a clause in their contract with the Hawks that, they claimed,  allowed them to buy up an exchange prospect's contract. NPB officials objected, stating that they had no intention of selling Murakami's contract to the Giants and telling them that Murakami was merely on loan for the 1964 season. After a two-month stalemate the Giants eventually agreed to send Murakami back to the Hawks after the 1965 season. Thus, after pitching one more season for the Giants, Murakami returned to Japan to play for the Hawks. This affair led to the 1967 United States – Japanese Player Contract Agreement, also known as the "working agreement", between MLB and NPB, which was basically a hands-off policy.

Complications

MLB and NPB officials created the posting system as a combined reaction to three cases in the 1990s, involving NPB players who moved to MLB. The first of these occurred in the winter of 1994 when pitcher Hideo Nomo, with the help of agent Don Nomura, became the second Japanese-born player to play in MLB, 30 years after Murakami. Nomo, who was not yet eligible for free agency in Japan, was advised by Nomura that the Japanese Uniform Players Contract's reserve clause limited the Kintetsu Buffaloes' control over him to Japan only. Nomo utilized this loophole by voluntarily retiring from NPB to terminate his contract with the Buffaloes, circumvent its reserve clause and play in MLB. He announced his retirement from NPB in late 1994 and signed with the Los Angeles Dodgers in February 1995, where he won the National League Rookie of the Year award. The following year, the Dodgers signed Nomo to a three-year, $4.3 million contract.

In early 1997, after months of negotiations, the San Diego Padres signed a working agreement with the Chiba Lotte Marines that gave the Padres exclusive signing rights to another Nomura client, Hideki Irabu. Although both Irabu and Nomura stated that Irabu would only sign with the New York Yankees, neither the Padres nor the Marines consulted Irabu before finalizing their deal. The Major League Baseball Players Association (MLBPA) sided with Irabu, stating that the arrangement unfairly disregarded a player's expressed wishes. However, MLB's executive council ruled that the Padres had not violated any existing rule, and therefore legally held the rights to Irabu. Following this decision, Irabu contemplated a number of different options, including playing in NPB until he became a free agent, and taking the matter to the U.S. judicial system. By May, however, the Padres gave in and traded Irabu to the Yankees, who signed him for $12.8 million over four years.

The final incident occurred in 1998, when Alfonso Soriano was unable to leave the Hiroshima Toyo Carp due to contract restrictions. Soriano disliked the intense Japanese practice schedule, and the Carp denied him a salary increase from $45,000 (the league's minimum) to $180,000 per year. Like Nomo and Irabu, Soriano hired Nomura to help his situation. After first attempting to void Soriano's NPB contract by unsuccessfully arguing that the player was legally a minor when he signed it Nomura advised him, like Nomo, to retire from NPB and pursue a career in MLB. This prompted Carp executives to file an injunction against Soriano and send letters to MLB teams demanding that they cease all negotiations with him. NPB officials claimed that after the Nomo case they had privately amended the Player Contract to give NPB teams the right to prohibit a player from signing a new contract anywhere after voluntarily retiring. Since MLB officials were not consulted and they did not agree to any changes, MLB Commissioner Bud Selig declared that MLB would recognize Soriano as a free agent on July 13, 1998, and the Carp backed down. He signed a 5-year, $3.1 million contract with the New York Yankees the same year.

Resolution
In 1998, Orix BlueWave general manager Shigeyoshi Ino rewrote the 1967 United States – Japanese Player Contract Agreement, when he drafted the "posting system". Selig and NPB Commissioner Hiromori Kawashima signed this new agreement in December 1998. It sought to address each of the problems brought up by the Nomo, Irabu and Soriano cases, by requiring MLB teams to place "bids" for NPB players. These bids became the basis of transfer fees that are paid as compensation to NPB teams whose star players sign with MLB. NPB players are also allowed to negotiate with MLB teams over the terms of their new contracts. Through the 2013 season, the agreement was in effect on a year-to-year basis, terminable at the option of either the MLB Commissioner or the NPB Commissioner provided notice to terminate is given by June 18 of any given year. A new agreement between MLB and NPB, with significantly different rules, was announced on December 16, 2013 and took effect immediately; it continued through the 2016 MLB and NPB seasons. The agreement was extended for an additional season during negotiations for a new agreement.

The current posting agreement was reached after the 2017 MLB and NPB seasons. The agreement runs through October 31, 2021, the expiration date of MLB's current collective bargaining agreement. Not all of the provisions applied immediately—for example, the Hokkaido Nippon-Ham Fighters were allowed to set a $20 million posting fee, the maximum allowed under the previous agreement, for two-way star Shohei Ohtani, whom they posted shortly after approval of the new agreement. Since the end of the 2018 NPB and MLB seasons, posting fees have been based on the type of contract a player signs and the deal's value. For players signed to MLB contracts, the posting fee is based on the amount of guaranteed money in the initial contract:
 20% of the first $25 million
 17.5% of the next $25 million
 15% of any amount above $50 million

For players signed to minor-league contracts, the fee is a flat 25% of the contract's value.

The system only applies to players currently under contract with a Japanese team, although players who have nine or more years of playing service with NPB are exempt. It does not apply to free agents or to amateur players who have never played in NPB. Mac Suzuki, Micheal Nakamura, Kazuhito Tadano, and Junichi Tazawa are the only Japanese players to have debuted in MLB without having played in NPB. The system does not work in reverse; it does not regulate MLB players, such as Alex Cabrera, who moved to NPB.

Process
When a player under contract with a Nippon Professional Baseball team wishes to play in Major League Baseball, he must notify his current team's management and request that they make him available for posting during the next posting period (November 1 – March 1 through the 2013 season, and November 1 – February 1 in the current agreement). The NPB team can reject this request, and the player will not be posted. However, if the team consents, the player is presented to the MLB Commissioner, who then notifies all MLB teams of the posted player.

In the original process, MLB held a four-day-long silent auction during which interested MLB teams submitted sealed bids in U.S. dollars to the Commissioner's Office. After the allotted four days passed, the Commissioner closed the bidding process and notified the posted player's NPB team of the highest bid amount but not who the bidding team was. The NPB team then had four days to either accept or reject the non-negotiable bid amount.

If the bid was rejected, the NPB team retained rights to the player. If it was accepted, the successful MLB team was granted the exclusive rights to negotiate with the player for 30 days. If the player and the MLB team agreed on contract terms before the 30-day period expired, the NPB team received the bid amount as a transfer fee within five business days. The player was then free to play for his new MLB team in the coming season. The transfer fee was not included when calculating an MLB team's total payroll, which is subject to a luxury tax when it exceeds $155 million. If the MLB team could not come to a contract agreement with the posted player, then no fee was paid and the rights to the player reverted to his NPB team. A player could request to be posted again in subsequent years, and the process would be repeated with no advantage to the club that had won the bidding the previous year.

Under the current process, the NPB team notifies the MLB Commissioner of a posting, with the posting fee determined by the value of the contract that a posted player eventually signs with an MLB organization. Once the MLB Commissioner announces the posting, the player has 30 days to sign with an MLB team. Unlike the past system, in which only the team that won the bidding process had negotiating rights, the current system allows the posted player to negotiate with any MLB team willing to pay the posting fee. As in the previous process, if the player signs with an MLB team during the negotiating window, the signing team will pay the posting fee; otherwise, his rights revert to his NPB team. Also mirroring the past system, an unsuccessfully posted player can request a posting in a later year, with the process repeated.

List of postings
Of the 61 Japanese-born players who have played in MLB, 18 have entered the league using the posting system. Since the system's creation in 1998, the 28 players that have used it have experienced a range of success. Of these 28, sixteen were immediately signed to Major League contracts and one player who drew no bids on his first posting was signed to a Major League contract on his second posting. These contracts range from $1.4 million to $155 million. Of the remaining twelve, four were signed to Minor League contracts, three were unable to reach a contract agreement and six were unsuccessful in drawing bids from any Major League clubs (one player failed to draw bids during two separate postings). The following tables outline each posting and its outcome.

Criticism
Since its implementation in late 1998 the posting system has been heavily criticized. Ichiro Suzuki's agent remarked that "the player literally gets zero advantage from [the posting system]... the Japanese teams benefit by holding the players hostage". Don Nomura called the process a "slave auction". Much of the criticism of the system stems from its forcing NPB players to negotiate their contracts solely with the MLB team that submitted the highest bid. The Japan Times columnist Marty Kuehnert believes that since no other team is allowed to submit competitive counter-offers, negotiations result in salaries below the player's market value. Kuehnert also believes the system fosters a "take-it-or-leave-it" situation; if the team and the player have not finalized contract negotiations by the end of a 30-day period, the team can make a low offer knowing that the player's only other option is to play in Japan for another year. It has been suggested that this is a violation of the Anti-Monopoly Act, a Japanese antitrust law that prohibits parties from signing an international agreement or contract that "contains such matters as constitute an unreasonable restraint of trade or unfair business practices".

The Japan Professional Baseball Players Association (JPBPA) was not consulted before the system was implemented by NPB club owners, and did not subsequently ratify it. Since its introduction JPBPA has expressed many concerns, likening the process to "human trafficking". Agreeing that the system  takes unfair advantage of NPB players, the MLBPA offered to help JPBPA fight the posting system in court. However, according to one JPBPA official, the Japanese court process is too long and involved; therefore, the "problem can't be helped".

Yomiuri Giants club representative Hidetoshi Kiyotake has expressed dislike of the system, because it enables Major League Baseball to poach players from Japan. By using the posting system, he says, Japanese teams make a profit in the short term, but by allowing Japan's best players to be sold to MLB, NPB teams and Japanese baseball suffer in the longer term. When Giants pitcher Koji Uehara asked to be posted in 2005, Kiyotake denied his request, saying: "We don't recognize the posting system. I've said from the beginning that this is out of the question."

In the middle of the 2012–13 posting season, MLB approached NPB seeking to change the way MLB teams bid for the right to negotiate with NPB players. Instead of using a silent auction in which teams bid blindly, MLB would prefer its teams to participate in a traditional, open auction where the bids are known and teams can knowingly outbid each other. Such a change would likely lower the price of the transfer fees paid to NPB teams. MLB and the players' unions agree that they'd prefer to see the players receive more money for the transfer rather than the teams. The Japan Times columnist Jason Coskrey also believed that these talks provided the JPBPA an opportunity to voice their concerns about the posting system and attempt to gain more leverage for themselves during the posting process. The new agreement, as noted, was announced on December 16, 2013, with most of the changes desired by MLB and players from both leagues.

2006–07 controversy

The posting system was criticized by MLB insiders and by the U.S. media, after the controversial 2006–07 posting period. Before the posting of the period's first player, Daisuke Matsuzaka, in early November 2006, there was speculation that he might draw bids as high as $30 million—more than twice the previous record bid  that Ichiro Suzuki had garnered in 2000–01. After his silent auction was closed, it was revealed that Matsuzaka had drawn a bid of $51.1 million, shocking American and Japanese baseball executives. The Boston Red Sox's winning bid was more than $11 million higher than the next largest.

With the negotiations between Matsuzaka and the Red Sox at a stalemate as the negotiation period neared its close, The Washington Post Dave Sheinin questioned both parties' intentions. Sheinin believed that the Red Sox had foreseen the contractual stalemate and had submitted a high bid simply to deny the New York Yankees an opportunity to negotiate with Matsuzaka. However, after Matsuzaka's agent Scott Boras threatened to take Matsuzaka back to NPB if his price was not met, Sheinin theorized that Boras intentionally wanted to hinder contract negotiations. ESPN The Magazine's Tim Kurkjian described the situation as "the most obvious game of chicken ever." Sheinin suggested that, should the negotiations fail, Boras could take legal action on the grounds that the requirement of MLB teams to pay large transfer fees to NPB teams artificially depressed the player's personal contract. Boras did not believe that the transfer fee should affect the player's compensation.

Despite the negotiation difficulties, the Boston Red Sox eventually signed Matsuzaka. The team paid approximately $103.1 million in total, including the transfer fee and contract, to acquire the pitcher. Kurkjian believes that with fees and contracts this high, small-market teams could not afford to compete with large-market teams for the rights to negotiate with some posted Japanese players. Kurkjian blames the posting system's use of a blind bidding system as the cause of Matsuzaka's "outrageous offer." He also postulates that Matsuzaka's high bid amount helped to inflate the bids for Kei Igawa who was posted two weeks later, perpetuating the problem further. After winning the negotiation rights to Igawa, Yankees' general manager Brian Cashman told reporters that "the posting system, clearly with what took place this winter, might not necessarily be the best system". Kurkjian claims that other MLB executives already believe that a traditional free agent structure, where the highest bidder wins, would be better than the current system. Cashman and Yankees team president Randy Levine met with NPB team officials in early 2007 to discuss the posting system, among other things. These meetings did not result in any immediate changes.

See also 
Baseball in Japan
Transfer in association football

Notes

References

External links
What is a Japanese Posting System
United States – Japanese Player Contract Agreement (posting system 1998–2013): English, Japanese

Major League Baseball labor relations
Nippon Professional Baseball
History of baseball